Luteru is a Samoan given name. Notable people with the name include:

Luteru Laulala (born 1995), New Zealand rugby union player
Luteru Ross Taylor (born 1984), New Zealand cricketer

Polynesian given names